Peter James O'Brien (8 June 1874 – 28 September 1947) was a New Zealand politician of the Labour Party.

Early life
O'Brien was born in 1874 at Forest Creek, near Castlemaine, Victoria, Australia. His parents of Irish descent were Terence O’Brien, a miner, and Bridget O’Leary. He was christened Peter James, but his first name was never used; many knew him as Jim or Briney. After having worked as a miner in various Australian states, O'Brien emigrated to New Zealand in 1904 and found employment as a coalminer in Reefton. O'Brien became active in the socialist circles that developed on the West Coast. He became president of the Westland Certificated Engine-drivers' and Firemen's Union, and was the president of the Runanga Co-operative Society.

Political career

Standing on a socialist ticket, he was voted onto the inaugural Runanga Borough Council in 1912. In 1913, he supported Paddy Webb's successful by-election campaign in the  electorate for the Social Democratic Party, and later became the president of the Runanga branch of the party. He was a member of the Greymouth Borough Council for eight years and he was deputy mayor for three of them. He was also a member of the Grey Power Board. O'Brien was twice president of the Grey branch of the Labour Party and helped to establish the Grey River Argus as a Labour daily newspaper.

He was the senior Government whip from 1939 until his promotion to the cabinet in 1942.

He was a Minister in the First Labour Government. He was Minister of Transport (9 December 1942 – 28 September 1947), Minister of Marine (9 December 1942 – 28 September 1947), Minister of Labour (27 June 1946 – 19 December 1946) and Minister of Mines (27 June 1946 – 19 December 1946). He remained an MP until his death, which caused a by-election held in December 1947 that was won by Labour's Jim Kent.

In 1935, he was awarded the King George V Silver Jubilee Medal.

Family and death
O'Brien married Kate Teresa Flaherty on 29 June 1909 in Greymouth. He died in Wellington on 28 September 1947. His wife survived him; they had no children.

Notes

References

|-

|-

|-

1874 births
1947 deaths
New Zealand Labour Party MPs
Social Democratic Party (New Zealand) politicians
Members of the Cabinet of New Zealand
New Zealand people of Irish descent
Members of the New Zealand House of Representatives
New Zealand MPs for South Island electorates
Australian emigrants to New Zealand
Unsuccessful candidates in the 1919 New Zealand general election
Unsuccessful candidates in the 1925 New Zealand general election
People from Castlemaine, Victoria